Penelope Jencks (born 1936 in Baltimore, Maryland, USA) is an American sculptor and a graduate of Boston University (BFA, 1958). Her public works include a statue of the historian Samuel Eliot Morison (1982) on Commonwealth Ave. in Boston, Massachusetts; and the Robert Frost Sculpture (2007) at Amherst College, Amherst, Massachusetts. She is best known, however, for her statue of Eleanor Roosevelt (1996) in New York City.

Eleanor Roosevelt Monument
The Eleanor Roosevelt Monument, located in New York City's Riverside Park, is said to be the first monument dedicated to an American president's wife. Hillary Clinton (First Lady at the time) gave the keynote address at the monument's October 1996 dedication.

The statue, the boulder on which it leans, and the foot stone on which it rests, all sculpted by Jencks, form the centerpiece of a heavily planted circular memorial designed by the landscape architects Bruce Kelly and David Varnell. The architect Michael Dwyer designed inscriptions in the surrounding granite pavement, including a quotation from Roosevelt's 1958 speech at the United Nations advocating universal human rights, and a bronze tablet, located in the planting bed, summarizing her achievements.

Gallery

References

American women sculptors
Living people
1936 births
Artists from Baltimore
Sculptors from Maryland
20th-century American sculptors
20th-century American women artists
21st-century American sculptors
21st-century American women artists
Boston University College of Fine Arts alumni
Riverside Park (Manhattan)